Shroom family member 2 is a protein that in humans is encoded by the SHROOM2 gene.

Function

This gene represents the human homolog of Xenopus laevis apical protein (APX) gene, which is implicated in amiloride-sensitive sodium channel activity. It is expressed in endothelial cells and facilitates the formation of a contractile network within endothelial cells. 

Depletion of this gene results in an increase in endothelial sprouting, migration, and angiogenesis. This gene is highly expressed in the retina, and is a strong candidate for ocular albinism type 1 syndrome. Alternatively spliced transcript variants have been found for this gene. [provided by RefSeq, Mar 2016].

References

Further reading